GASA Group (Gartnernes Salgsforeninger; "co-operative marketing organisations") is a Danish company that imports and exports flowers, fruits, and vegetables. Founded in 1929 as a fruit, flowers and vegetable auction co-operative, the multinational company is headquartered in Odense.

In addition to Denmark, the company has nurseries in Costa Rica, Italy, and Sweden, and sales organizations in England, Germany, the Netherlands, Italy, and Sweden.

About three-quarters of GASA's sales are exports and it is one of the biggest distributors of potted plants in Europe. The company is owned by Dansk Landbrugs Grovvareselskab (47%) and the Danish potted-plant producers (27%). The remaining 26% is owned by Gartnernes Forsikring and a number of banks. GASA Group was established in its present form in 2001 when GASA Aarhus A/S and GASA Odense-Blomster A/S established a collaboration. In 2004, the companies became GASA Group Denmark A/S.

References

External links
Official website

Wholesalers of Denmark
Multinational companies headquartered in Denmark
Danish companies established in 1929
Companies based in Odense Municipality
Organizations based in Odense
Former cooperatives
Cooperatives in Denmark